Godmaniais a genus of five species of flowering plants in the family Bignoniaceae, native to the new world tropics.

Species
Godmania aesculifolia
Godmania dardanoi
Godmania luteola
Godmania macrocarpa
Godmania uleana

References

Bignoniaceae
Bignoniaceae genera